Davudabad is a city in Markazi Province, Iran

Davudabad may also refer to:
 Davudabad, Khuzestan
 Davudabad, Kohgiluyeh and Boyer-Ahmad
 Davudabad, Khomeyn, Markazi Province
 Davudabad, Tehran
 Davudabad, West Azerbaijan